The Mamar Mosque is an 18th-century Azerbaijani mosque located in the Məmər village of Qubadli District in Azerbaijan.

History
The mosque was built in the 18th century. The mosque was used as a warehouse during the Soviet era. After Azerbaijan's independence in 1991, the mosque was reopened as a place of worship. In 1993, as a result of the First Nagorno-Karabakh War, the territory of the Qubadli District, including the village of Məmər, was occupied by Armenian forces. During the occupation, the mosque was used as a pigsty, which drew criticism from Azerbaijani officials and the Organization of Islamic Cooperation.

In 2001, the Mamar Mosque was declared an "architectural monument of local importance" by the Cabinet of Azerbaijan. On 30 October 2020, Azerbaijan recaptured the village of Məmər, including its mosque.

References

Monuments and memorials in Azerbaijan
Mosques in Azerbaijan
Art crime
Vandalism
Mosques destroyed by Christians